Saint Basiliscus of Comana (or Basilicus of Pontus; died ) in what is now northern Turkey was a Greek martyr.
His feast day is 22 May, or 30 July in the Greek calendar.

Life

The story of Basilicus is an example of an itinerant martyrdom.
He was arrested in Amasya in Pontus, but was allowed to go to the village of Choumiala to see his family before returning to Amasya for trial.
He was then taken to the village of Dakozara before being martyred outside Comana.
He is associated with the martyrs Eutropius and Cleonicus during his journey, in which he was followed by a crowd and performed various miracles.

Another version say Basiliscus, Bishop of Comana, was decapitated around 312 at Nicomedia by the tyrant Maximinus Daza (r. 310–313).
The biography of John Chrysostom says that Basiliscus, Bishop of Comana, was martyred under Maximian (r. 286–305).

Monks of Ramsgate account

The monks of St Augustine's Abbey, Ramsgate, wrote in their Book of Saints (1921),

Roman Martyrology

The Roman Martyrology says, under The Twenty-Second Day of May,

Butler's account

The hagiographer Alban Butler wrote in his Lives of the Primitive Fathers, Martyrs, and Other Principal Saints under May 22,

Notes

Sources

 
 

 

Saints of medieval Greece
310 deaths